Ōhinetamatea River / Saltwater Creek is a river in the Westland District of New Zealand.

The river rises on the north flank of the Copland Range and flows generally northward until it reaches the valley of the Cook River and turns westward. The river passes to the south of an ancient glacial moraine which separates its lower reaches from the Cook River valley.

See also
List of rivers of New Zealand

References

Westland District
Rivers of the West Coast, New Zealand
Rivers of New Zealand